Tarik Robertson is a Canadian former soccer player who played as a defender.

Career

College
He played college soccer with the Sheridan Bruins. In 2014, after converting the winning penalty kick in the shootout in the semi-finals, helping the Bruins advance to the finals, they won the CCAA National Championship.

Club
From 2011 to 2013, he was playing with Brampton City United FC in the Canadian Soccer League.

While with Toronto FC Academy, he played with Toronto FC III in League1 Ontario in 2014 and 2015. In 2014, he won the League1 Ontario title and the Inter-Provincial Cup with TFCIII.

On April 15, 2015, he signed an Amateur Player Agreement with Toronto FC II of the USL. He made his debut that same day against the Pittsburgh Riverhounds, being sent off in the match after receiving a red card.

In 2016, he joined Oakville Blue Devils FC in League1 Ontario. He made 15 appearances that season, scoring one goal on August 23 against his former team Toronto FC III.

In 2018, he played with the Woodbridge Strikers, appearing in 15 league matches and 2 playoff matches.

References

Living people
Canadian soccer players
Association football defenders
Toronto FC players
Toronto FC II players
Blue Devils FC players
Woodbridge Strikers players
Brampton United players
Canadian Soccer League (1998–present) players
League1 Ontario players
United Soccer League players
Year of birth missing (living people)